The men's 800 metres event at the 1994 Commonwealth Games was held on 23, 24 and 26 August at the Centennial Stadium in Victoria, British Columbia.

Medalists

Results

Heats
Source:

Semifinals
Source:

Final

References

800
1994